Floricienta (known in English as Flinderella) is an Argentine juvenile musical telenovela based on the Cinderella story. It originally aired from 2004 to 2005, but since then it has been broadcast in many countries. Some international channels that have air Floricienta are TVE International, Disney Channel Latin America, Cartoon Network and Disney Channel Europe. It was also available in the United Kingdom on the Sky satellite lineup.

The lead roles were portrayed by two-time Martín Fierro-Award-winning actress Florencia Bertotti, Juan Gil Navarro, Isabel Macedo, Fabio Di Tomaso and Benjamín Rojas. The show was created by Cris Morena and was produced by Cris Morena Group in association with RGB Entertainment.

The series became an international phenomenon for children and teens throughout Latin America, Israel and parts of Europe.

The telenovela spawned over 200 licensed products. The tour was attended by over 1 million people in Latin America and Israel including over 100 concerts in Teatro Gran Rex, ten shows in Luna Park stadium and four at Estadio Vélez, all in Buenos Aires.

The show was adapted by Bandeirantes in Brazil (Floribella), SIC in Portugal, TVN in Chile, RCN Televisión in Colombia and Televisa in Mexico. In an interview with Radio 10, Cris Morena announced she sold the Latin American rights for Disney Channel.

Overview
The famous Argentinian producer Cris Morena presented her new project Floricienta in 2004, the show became one of her biggest international hits alongside Rebelde way.

The title, Floricienta, is a mix of Flor (the main character, Florencia, nickname) with Cenicienta (Cinderella). Floricienta was a modern re-telling of Cinderella and The Sound of Music. The story was especially developed by Morena as a starring-vehicle for Florencia Bertotti which was cherry-picked by the producer.

There are a few similarities between the show and another Cinderella modern re-telling, the movie A Cinderella Story such as the Converse sneakers instead of the glass slipper, but the movie and the show were in production at the same time. (Floricienta premiered on Canal 13 in March 2004, while the movie debuted in the United States in July).

Floricienta was critically acclaimed for its fun storyline, dialogue, creative editing, post-production and the charisma of the main actress, Florencia Bertotti. It became the biggest licensing brand in Argentina in 2004 and 2005. Over 300 licensed products were available during the shows two-years run and even Floricienta branded apples were put on market.

Floricienta started with 14 points in its first episode. The show achieved ratings of over 30 points with the death of Federico at the end of the first season, being one of the most watched Morena’s hits in history. The first season was the highest-rated afternoon-slot show in Canal 13 history.

After the huge twist in the end of the first season, many fans of Federico did not liked how the story turned out after his death and drifted away from the show. The ratings for the second season suffered because of that, but the show continued to be huge and won its time-slot. The TV show ended with Florencia's marriage in front of a huge live audience and the finale was also a hit, with 25 points.

Floricienta, like most of Morena's productions, had a huge Broadway style live musical in Teatro Gran Rex during the Winter vacations. Demand for tickets were extremely high with some concerts selling out in less than five minutes. In 2004, to satisfy the demand, the cast played two concerts at Estadio Vélez Sarsifield with over 80,000 people attending.

In 2005, another musical was done and it was also a huge success with tickets selling out in minutes. Because of this, eight extra shows were played in Luna Park stadium in Buenos Aires. After the show ended, the complete cast (with the exception of Fabio Di Tomaso who pulled out after disagreements with the production company) waved goodbye in front of 40,000 people at another sold-out concert at José Amalfitani Stadium. The musical was also presented in Rosario, La Plata and Mar del Plata.

The two Floricienta albums were also very successful, with the first album being the third best-selling album in 2004 and the 10th best-selling album in 2005 and with the album from the second season being the biggest seller in 2005 according to CAPIF.

Floricienta was also a huge success in most of Latin-America, where it was aired by many local channels and at the Disney Channel.

The cast made a series of successful shows all over Latin America.  The show cast also made sold-out concerts in Tel-Aviv, Israel where they performed in front of thousands of fans. Over 1 million people attended Floricienta tour in Argentina, Mexico, Venezuela, Dominican Republic, Israel, Guatemala, Chile, Peru, Uruguay, Bolivia among many other territories.

In 2004, a Brazilian version was produced, named Floribella. It doubled the ratings of Rede Bandeirantes at its timeslot, over 40 products were released and the two CDs achieved platinum certifications. In 2006, a Portuguese version was also aired at SIC and was a massive hit. The first CD was one of the most CDs sold on the Portugal's story and over 150 products were released in the country. Because of the massive success of the show, SIC bought the rights to 3 other Cris Morena shows: Alma Pirata, Rebelde Way and Chiquititas (aired in 2007).

A version from Chile (also called Floribella) was also produced with great acceptance and the Mexican version (Lola...Érase una vez) also did well. There was also a Colombian version and the rights were bought for Greece and Russia, among other countries.

In an interview with Radio 10 in February 2009, Morena revealed Disney had bought the rights for an American remake.

Background
Floricienta is loosely adapted from the story of Cinderella (Cenicienta, in Spanish-speaking countries) and also presents some comparisons to the film The Sound of Music. The plot revolves around Florencia (Flor), a poor dreamer. She is also a rash, vivacious, cheerful and happy Italian Argentine girl whose life changes when she meets Federico Fritzenwalden, the  older son of a very rich German Argentine family whose parents died in an accident. Federico is the older brother and head of the family and has 5 younger siblings (Nico, Franco, Maia, Martín, Tomás) living under his responsibility in a big house with him. Fede has a bitter, cold, strict, rigid and lonely personality until he falls in love with Flor.  But Fede has a girlfriend, Delfina, who wants Federico's money. Federico's brothers hate Delfina, but when Flor comes to the Fritzenwaldens' residence, hired by Fede as the nanny, everybody loves her.

Floricienta was influenced by the original Cinderella story in many ways:
Fede is referred to as "Flor's Prince Charming."
Flor's trademark is her shoes (in the pilot, she loses one of her shoes at Fede's house when she is initially hired as a singer for a party, and Fede searches for her).
Flor is helped by her godmother, Titina, throughout the series.
One plot twist is that the villain, Malala, is revealed to be Flor's stepmother, making her rival, Delfina, her half-sister, and Sofía her other half-sister.
Flor claims to see fairies throughout the series.
The fact that Flor is a maid, who marries into wealth and nobility.

At the end of the first season, the show has a big twist.

Federico, after realizing that his girlfriend Delfina was lying to him all the time, leaves her at the church during their wedding and goes to Flor. He then dies in an accident while saving Máximo Calderón de la Hoya, who then gives his Body to Federico's soul. In the second season, Flor falls in love with Máximo and they get married in the end. They have three children and a very strong love that came from the part of Fede inside Max.

Plot

First season 
Florencia Fazzarino, an orphan girl who tries to live and works in a greengrocery store, dedicating her free time to her friends in the band. When the singer leaves, Florencia takes her place in the group and they get a presentation at the party organized by the brothers Nicolás Fritzenwalden and Maia Fritzenwalden in their mansion. There his destiny will be united forever to that of that family. On the other hand, Federico Fritzenwalden, the older brother of the family, has to return from Germany in order to take over the family business and his four brothers who have been orphaned by parents. His arrival coincides with the party that his brothers have organized without his consent and there he meets Florencia among the foam and unable to recognize it. Soon clashes between him, serious and responsible with his little brothers will begin. And after the escape of the minor named Tomás there will be numerous misunderstandings that will eventually lead Florencia to the mansion to work as a nanny. In the mansion Florencia will win everyone's love. When Malala and Delfina learn that Florencia is not the biological daughter of Eduardo Fazzarino but Alberto Santillán they do the impossible so that Florencia does not find out. They create multiple situations that will face Delfina and Florencia but leaving Federico in between. However, Federico will always prefer Florencia. Finally, Florencia finds out but Delfina seems to have never known and Malala makes several excuses to avoid Florencia claiming her inheritance and being ruined. Florencia falls madly in love with Federico. Being reciprocated by him, they begin a very beautiful and secret love, which becomes impossible when the evil stepsister Delfina makes Federico believe she is pregnant. Then this is the cause of a very serious illness the gynecologist Claudio Bonilla and the real husband of Delfina named Lorenzo who pretends to be a Chinese doctor so that everyone thinks she is sick. There Florencia convinces Federico to marry Delfina to give her happiness before her death. Already at the altar, Federico humiliates her before everyone by refusing to marry her and announcing that he loves Florencia. They rejoin but their love has a tragic turn after Federico's heroic death in a car accident since he interposed to save the life of Conde Máximo Augusto Calderón de la Hoya. Federico will have time to say goodbye to his great, unique and painful love and leave his brothers in charge of Conde Máximo Augusto Calderón de la Hoya. Thus ends the season with the meeting in the foam of Florencia and Conde Máximo Augusto Calderón de la Hoya as happened when she and Federico met. Finally, all this happens when Federico leaves the body of Conde Máximo Augusto Calderón de la Hoya to go definitively to heaven.

Second season 
After the death of Federico (Juan Gil Navarro), Florencia (Florencia Bertotti) meets the Count in foam that turns out to be the reason why Federico had died since he saved his life so that he would not be hit by a car. There is a video in which Federico had recorded the death of the Count on the ground saying that Federico "was" in Máximo (Fabio Di Tomaso) and had to wake up his sleeping heart. Máximo feels that something strange is happening to him because of the irremediable love he has for Flor as if he knew her from another life. Added to this is new ability to handle airplanes, use of foil and love for the Fritzenwalden family.

Florencia and Máximo face a series of funny situations which they will have to fight to defend their love since Delfina (Isabel Macedo) wants to conquer Máximo to keep his fortune and have any cravings he wants to be the Countess of Krikoragán, situations such as blackmail for alleged donation of marrow carried out by Delfina to Ana [Máximo's mother (Claudia Lapacó)] supposed disease with which she remains after this donation will be situations that must be overcome.

But Máximo falls in love with Florencia and Delfina will put a series of obstacles to prevent their happiness and that Florencia receives an inheritance from Santillán but she will not succeed. She will also confuse Florencia with these obstacles, making her feel guilty about her relationship with Máximo. But force of destiny, fairies and magic of Florence with them. In the end, he claims an inheritance and Malala (Graciela Stéfani), Delfina and Malala's husband, that is, Bonilla (Gerardo Chendo) end up in jail for hiding the truth and for the near-murder of Flor when they went on a camping day. Florencia becomes pregnant with the Count and triplets named Federico are born, (who is probably the reincarnation of Fede) Andrés and Margarita. Delfina kidnaps Margarita and realizes that that special being could have been hers if she had not been so bad and she did not hate her husband. She returns Margarita by ending great evil and turning good. In baby baptism she asks forgiveness for her wrongdoing. Franco (Benjamín Rojas) upon discovering that he is adopted, returns with Olivia (Brenda Gandini) and they go to a tennis tournament abroad. But after a fight, Olivia returns home. At the end when Franco returns home days later they reconcile. Finally Floricienta and Count Máximo get married in a beautiful wedding.

Cast 
 Florencia Bertotti as Florencia Fazzarino Valente/Florencia Santillán Valente
 Juan Gil Navarro as Federico Fritzenwalden 
 Fabio Di Tomaso as Máximo Augusto Calderón de la Hoya
 Isabel Macedo as Delfina Santillán Torres-Oviedo/Rosita Violeta Torres
 Benjamín Rojas as Franco Fritzenwalden/Franco Calderón
 Esteban Prol as Lorenzo "Lolo" Mónaco
 Nicolás Maiques as Nicolás Fritzenwalden/Lautaro Fritzenwalden
 Agustín Sierra as Martín "Tincho" Fritzenwalden
 Stéfano de Gregorio as Tomás Fritzewalden
 Graciela Stefani as María Laura "Malala" Torres-Oviedo Vda. de Santillán
 Ángeles Balbiani as Sofía Santillán Torres-Oviedo
 Brenda Gandini as Olivia Fritzenwalden
 Camila Bordonaba as Paloma Mónaco/Julieta Mónaco
 Mariana Seligmann as Clara Alcántara 
 Lali Espósito as Roberta "Robertita" Espinosa
 María Eugenia Suárez as Paz Alcántara
 Henny Trayles as Greta Van Beethoven
 Zulma Faiad as Teresa "Titina" Ramos
 Hilda Bernard as Nilda Santillán
 Mariana Seligmann as Clara Alcántara 
 Claudia Lapacó as Condesa Ana de la Hoya
 Isabel Sarli as Coca Torres-Oviedo
 Norberto Díaz as Eduardo Fazzarino
 Inés Palombo as Elena Herrera
 Guido Kaczka as Alejandro
 Diego Mesaglio as Damián
 Diego Child as Danilo
 Micaela Vázquez as Renata
 Catalina Artusi as Marina
 Gastón Soffritti as Thiago
 Felipe Colombo as Miki
 Gastón Dalmau as Joaquín
 María Fernanda Neil as Jazmín
 Jennifer Williams as Jimena
 Piru Sáez as Piru
 Jorge Maggio as Julián
 Mauricio Navarro as Gonzalo
 Alberto Anchart as Antoine
 Alejo García Pintos as Evaristo
 Diego Olivera as Facundo
 Esmeralda Mitre as Lucía
 Elena Roger as Mora
 Lydia Lamaison as Helena
 Vivian El Jaber as Yvonne
 Ana María Giunta as Alelí
 Gustavo Guillén as Cacho
 Diego García as Chucky
 Mario Pergolini as God
 Silvina Bosco as Olivia's mother
 Marcelo Alfaro as Olivia's father
 Gustavo Mac Lennan as Court judge
 Gustavo Bonfigli as Dr Grimberg
 Helena Jios as Boarding school director
 Alfredo Alessandro as Juvenile judge
 Silvia Balcells as Directora Domenech
 Paola Sallustro as Maia Fritzenwalden
 Laura Azcurra as Amélie Vda. de Fritzenwalden
 Esteban Pérez as Matías Ripamonti
 Gerardo Chendo as Claudio Paul Bonilla 
 Dolores Sarmiento as María Klinger
 Mirta Wons as Beba Torres-Oviedo
 Emilia Mazer as Margarita Valente
 Germán Kraus as Carlos Fazzarino
 Federico Olivera as Segundo Tarragón de la Hoya
 Franco Rau as Ramiro Fritzenwalden
 Pipa as Max "Pipa" Fritzenwalden
 Gastón Ricaud as Maximiliano Stoffa
 Alex Benn as Mateo Calderón
 Coni Marino as Julia Guerrero
 Mariana Richaudeau as Camila Acosta
 Silvia Trawier as Pancha García / Moncha
 Maida Andrenacci as Valentina
 Micol Estévez as Dominique
 Pablo Heredia as Pedro
 Adriana Ferrer as Violeta
 Geraldine Visciglio as María del Carmen
 Carlos Kaspar as Óscar
 Carolina Pampillo as Laura
 Paula Morales as Silvina
 Gabriel Gallicchio as Lucas
 Nicole Luis as Luz
 Delfina Varni as Victoria
 Agustina Palma as Agustina
 Victorio D'Alessandro as Fabián
 Esteban Meloni as Ariel
 Julia Calvo as Marta 
 Giselle Bonaffino as Isolinda
 Guido Pennelli as Axel
 Anahí Martella as Amalia
 Antonio Caride as Raúl
 Irene Goldszer as Mirta
 Mercedes Funes as Miranda
 Verónica Pelaccini as Mercedes
 Paula Kohan as Sol
 Candela Vetrano as Guillermina Ponce
 Gabriela Vaca Guzmán as Wendy
 Gerónimo Rauch as Gero
 Lucas Merayo as Patricio
 Omar Calicchio as Rick
 Ezequiel Abeijón as Bernardo
 Mauro Dolce as Pipo
 Daniel Miglioranza as Fauve
 Marcelo Serre as Poncella
 Miguel Ángel Rodríguez as Priest

First season worldwide broadcasts

Second season worldwide broadcasters

Worldwide 
 : La Tele (2005) / Paravisión (2014)
 : Channel 23 (2005) / Channel 50 (2013)
 : ET1 (2006)
 : ANT1 (2007)
 : BTV (2006)

Songs

1ª temporada (First season)
 Chaval Chulito by Flor
 Pobres los Ricos by the cast of Floricienta
 Ven a Mi by Franco and Flor, it has an acoustic version too
 Mi Vestido Azul by Flor, it has an acoustic version too
 Kikiriki by Facha and Flor
 Por Qué by Flor, it has an acoustic version too
 Quereme Sólo a Mí by Delfina and Flor
 Y Así Será by Flor and Federico
 Floricienta by the cast of Floricienta, opening song
 Y La Vida by Flor and Federico
 Tic-Tac by Flor
 Los Niños No Mueren by Flor

2ª temporada (Second season)
 Corazones al Viento (by Flor) (Opening song)
 Cosas que Odio de Vos (By Flor and Maximo)
 Flores Amarillas (By Flor)
 Que Esconde el Conde (By Flor)
 Desde Que Te Vi (By Franco)
 Ding Dong (By Flor)
 Un Enorme Dragón (By Flor)
 Caprichos (By Delfina)
 Vos Podés (By Flor)
 Te Siento (By Flor)
 A Bailar (Cast Floricienta)
 Hay un Cuento (By Flor)

Also performed in the series's episodes but instead found in the Theater 2005 CD are:
 Algo de Tí (by Lorenzo)
 Contigo amigo (by Tasos)
 Tú (by Flor and Maximo)
 Close cover (by Wim Mertens)

Theater 2004
 Solo mio (By Delfina)
 Laberinto (By Franco, Fede and Flor)

Theater 2005
 Yo creo en milagros (By Flor) (Same music of "Los niños no mueren")
 Miau miau (By Franco) (Same music of "Kikiriki")
 Princesa de la terraza (By Lorenzo)

Products and live shows
The producers, CMG/RGB Entertainment, have launched CDs, DVDs, and a huge range of products trademark, and licensed merchandise. They also produced live shows presenting the main actors of the TV show in a musical-play related to the program's plot. Floricienta, the live show got a high rate of acceptance and massive audience going to each live show in tour in Argentina, all of them got sold-out in minutes, and moreover, due to the high rates of audience at international levels, they launched the tour by visiting other countries overseas as well.

Tour
Floricienta and her music band transcended TV screens and offered live performances in theater play- format (in Argentina) and concerts-musicals format including almost all the cast in many Latin American countries and in Israel. During these successful tours, actors could meet their fans face to face, gave interviews, TV and radio reports, press conferences, awards for records delivering, etc.

2004-2005
During these years Floricienta presented successful live shows in Argentina.

2005
Floricienta was successful in Israel in 2005.

2006
The Tour of Dreams 2006 visited many countries with sold out records in the most important cities of these countries:
 Guatemala: Guatemala City
 El Salvador: San Salvador
 Dominican Republic: Santo Domingo
 Panama: Panama City
 Peru: Lima
 Venezuela: Maracaibo, Valencia, Caracas
 Ecuador: Quito, Guayaquil

2007
Two and a half years after this soap opera ended, Floricienta:The Tour of Dreams 2007 visited Mexico for the first time. Even though the time distance, it had such a great success and acceptation of the Mexican audience,  Floricienta: The tour of Dreams in Mexico, was absolutely profitable to stir up Floricienta's feelings fans. This tour was presented in these important Mexican cities:
 Guadalajara
 México D.F.
 Monterrey
 Puebla
 Querétaro
 San Luis Potosí
 Veracruz

CDs
Floricienta has so far 7 CDs. These are:
 Floricienta y su banda [2004]
 Floricienta y su banda karaoke [2004]
 Floricienta [2005]
 Floricienta karaoke [2005]
 Floricienta especial navidad- Christmas special edition [2007]
 Floricienta princesa de la terazza- the balcony princess [2006]
 Floricienta grandes éxitos- greatest hits- [2007]

DVDs
 Floricienta en el Teatro-Floricienta at the theater
 Floricienta 2: Gran Rex 2005 Princesa de la Terraza- Floricienta at Gran Rex Venue- The princess of the balcony
 Floricienta Temporada 1: First season episodes in 6 DVDs packs (Is a brief version and it is only available in Spain)
 Floricienta Temporada 1: Dubbed into Greek, targeted to all Balkan region countries. Available in Greece.

Music videos
 Por Qué (Why)
 Ven a mí (Come to me)
 Tú (You)
 Enorme dragón (Enormous dragon)
 Mi vestido azul (My blue dress)
 Flores amarillas (Yellow Flowers) (broadcast in MTV channels)
 Apertura de la primera temporada - Tema: Floricienta -Overture of first season.
 Apertura de la segunda temporada - Tema: Corazones al viento (hearts flying) overture of second season.

Television specials 
 Floricienta: El tour de los Sueños Latinoamérica- Tour of Dreams Latin America
 Floricienta: El tour de los Sueños en México- Tour of Dreams, México
 200 Flores (especial 200 programas) - 200Flowers. Special celebrating 200 episodes.
 Flori 100 ta: (especial 100 programas primera temporada) - Special celebrating 100 episodes.
 Especial 300 programas (especial 300 programas de la segunda temporada) -Special celebrating 300 episodes (Second season).
 Floricienta&The Count's wedding:Thousands of Floricienta's fans attended to this fiction wedding show, where they could see their favorite actors for real in the same place and time. The "ceremony" seems so real due to the fact it was the first time a soap opera included fans on a wedding ceremony as audience in a real set, which was a famous stadium located in Buenos Aires City. Thousands of excited fans witnessed  the famous happy ending fairy tale's style final episode shoot in a super production with a crowded live show including all Floricienta's cast, lively recorded and broadcast in the final episode.
 The kisses corner:TV program regarding Floricienta. It was weekly broadcast in Venezuela. The program presented reports and other items regarding the plot in its first season, characters, actor's biographies, contests, etc. "The kisses corner" was attended by Floricienta's fans, making this show an interactive program.

References

External links
 
 Official YouTube channel

2004 telenovelas
2005 telenovelas
2004 Argentine television series debuts
2005 Argentine television series endings
Argentine telenovelas
Spanish-language telenovelas
Musical telenovelas
Children's telenovelas
Teen telenovelas
Television series about orphans